Xenodice may refer to:

Xenodice (mythology), various characters in Greek mythology
Pausanias described the tomb of Xenodice at Sicyon, who died in childbirth. "It has not been made after the native fashion, but so as to harmonize best with the painting, which is very well worth seeing."

In biology:

Xenodice, an amphipod genus in the family Podoceridae
Cyanopepla xenodice, a moth species in the family Erebidae